Axell "Slay" Hodges (born August 20, 1996) is an X Games and motocross competitor. In July 2019, Hodges was supposed to participate in History's "Evel Live 2", but a few days before the live performance, he sustained serious injuries in a crash during a practice jump in which he was attempting to beat a record set by Robbie Maddison in 2011 of jumping 378 feet and 9 inches on a motorcycle.

Competition history
In 2012 Hodges won the C Class Loretta Lynn's Amateur Championship, known as the world's largest amateur motocross race.

Hodges received gold in the Moto X Quarterpipe High Air and bronze in Moto X Best Whip at X Games Minneapolis 2018. He has received a total of seven X Games medals.

Media 
Hodges commands a large social media following. He was a guest on the MTV show Ridiculousness.

References

External links 
 
 

X Games athletes
1996 births
Living people
World record setters in motorcycling